Lady Luck is a 1936 American comedy film directed by Charles Lamont. It was made by Chesterfield Motion Pictures Corporation.

Plot
In New York City, Mamie Murphy is working as a manicurist when she hears on the salon's radio that she has won $2,500 on the racehorse Lady Luck in the sweepstakes draw, with the chance to win a further $150,000. Newspaper reporter Dave Haines is sent to interview Mamie because he already knows her and fancies her. She turns down his invitation to accompany him that evening to the Blue Moon nightclub, but accepts an invitation from "businessman" Jack Conroy to meet there.

Conroy, who is actually a financially strapped playboy, is visited at his home by mild-mannered James Hemingway, who half-heartedly threatens him with a revolver and tells him to stay away from his wife. Conroy denies any involvement with her.

Arriving at the Blue Moon about 9pm, Conroy wines and dines Mamie, while being watched scathingly by Mrs. Hemingway who is seated nearby. It's obvious that Conroy has in fact had a romantic liaison with her.

The next day at the salon, Mamie signs a deal with theatrical agents Feinberg Goldberg Sternberg & O'Rooney that will give her a career in showbiz, but only if she wins the $150,000 sweepstake. The win is stipulated because it will give Mamie and any productions in which she appears an enormous amount of free publicity.

That evening Mamie learns that she hasn't won anything at all when the real winner, an older woman also named Mamie Murphy, turns up at her door. The older Murphy offers to keep silent so the showbiz deal will go through.

The horse race is held and Lady Luck wins. Mamie is now making newspaper headlines, and she and "Aunt" Mamie accept the offer from a real estate dealer to move into a plush apartment complete with servants for one month, for his publicity purposes. Mamie and Conroy publicly announce plans to marry.

A maid at the new apartment overhears Mamie telling "Aunt" Mamie the whereabouts of her ticket. Soon after, Mamie and Aunt Mamie are drugged with laced coffee and sleep for hours. They find Conroy's dead body in the room when they awaken.

Haines, Mamie, Aunt Mamie, Conroy's valet Briggs, Hemingway and his wife all come under suspicion, but eventually it's revealed that Blue Moon owner Tony Morelli and his wife Rita had planned to get their hands on the sweepstake ticket from the start and had set up the loan of the apartment with crooked servants for that purpose. Their plan was to get the ticket, pass off Rita as Mamie, and collect a fortune from a banker in exchange for the ticket. Conroy had unexpectedly arrived ahead of the banker, realized a plot was going on, and threatened to reveal the plotters to police so that Mamie's fortune and his marriage to her wouldn't be jeopardized. Tony had shot him and implicated Mamie and Aunt Mamie.

The rich Aunt Mamie is attracted to Detective Lieutenant James Riley and they go off to a movie together. Mamie, although left with nothing, realises that may be better than the troubles brought on by fame and fortune, and resumes her feisty friendship with Dave Haines.

Cast 
Patricia Farr as Mamie Murphy
William Bakewell as Dave Haines
Lulu McConnell as "Aunt" Mamie Murphy
Duncan Renaldo as Tony Morelli
Iris Adrian as Rita
Jameson Thomas as Jack Conroy
Lew Kelly as Det. Lieutenant James Riley
Vivian Oakland as Mrs. Hemingway
Claude Allister (sic) as Briggs (Conroy's valet)
Arthur Hoyt as Mr. Hemingway
 John Kelly as Joe (bouncer at the Blue Moon)
Charles Lane as Mr. Feinberg

External links 

1936 films
American comedy films
American black-and-white films
Chesterfield Pictures films
Films directed by Charles Lamont
1936 comedy films
1930s English-language films
1930s American films